Narsapur Assembly constituency is a constituency of Telangana Legislative Assembly, India. It is one of 10 constituencies in Medak district. It is part of Medak Lok Sabha constituency.

Chilumula Madan Reddy of Telangana Rashtra Samithi is the sitting MLA of the constituency since 2014.

Mandals
The Assembly Constituency presently comprises the following Mandals:

Members of Legislative Assembly 
Members of Legislative Assembly who represented Narsapur

Election results

Telangana Legislative Assembly election, 2018

Telangana Legislative Assembly election, 2014

See also
 List of constituencies of Telangana Legislative Assembly

References

Assembly constituencies of Telangana
Medak district